This is a list of Ligue 1 players who have made 400 or more appearances in Ligue 1. Current Ligue 1 players and their clubs are shown in bold.

Players

References
Ranking at BDFútbol

Citations

Ligue 1
Association football player non-biographical articles